Clarke Currie Scholes (November 25, 1930 – February 5, 2010) was an American competition swimmer and Olympic champion.

Scholes was awarded the gold medal in the 100-meter freestyle at the 1952 Summer Olympics in Helsinki, Finland.  His posted time of 57.4 seconds for the event matched that of fellow competitor Hiroshi Suzuki of Japan. Officials used a judge's decision and awarded Scholes the gold medal. He also won gold medals in the 100-meter freestyle and 4×100-meter medley relay at the 1955 Pan American Games.

In 1948, as a Redford High School senior, Scholes won Detroit City League titles in the 50- and 100-yard freestyle.  He attended Michigan State University, and swam for the Michigan State Spartans swimming and diving team in National Collegiate Athletic Association (NCAA) competition.  While under the direction of coach Charles McCaffree, Clarke was transformed into a five-time All-American and three-time NCAA champion in the 100-yard freestyle.

Scholes was inducted into the International Swimming Hall of Fame in 1980.  He was part of the inaugural class of thirty inductees into the Michigan State University Sports Hall of Fame in 1992, and he was inducted into the Michigan Sports Hall of Fame in 2008.

See also
 List of members of the International Swimming Hall of Fame
 List of Michigan State University people
 List of Olympic medalists in swimming (men)

References

1930 births
2010 deaths
American male freestyle swimmers
Michigan State Spartans men's swimmers
Olympic gold medalists for the United States in swimming
Pan American Games gold medalists for the United States
Swimmers from Detroit
Swimmers at the 1952 Summer Olympics
Swimmers at the 1955 Pan American Games
Medalists at the 1952 Summer Olympics
Pan American Games medalists in swimming
Medalists at the 1955 Pan American Games
Redford High School alumni